Hypomeces rusticus is a species of the true weevil family.

Description
This species has an intense yellow pubescence all over the body. It is a  polyphagous weevil feeding on the leaves of a wide variety of plants.

Distribution
This species can be found in East India, Thailand, Laos, Java and Timor.

References 

 Carl Joseph Schönherr, Johann Christian Fabricius  Genera et species Curculionidum, cum synonyma hujus familiae, Volume 6, Issue 1
 Catalogue of Life
 Wtaxa
 Global Species

Entiminae
Beetles described in 1840